Sassenberg()  is a town in the district of Warendorf, in North Rhine-Westphalia, Germany. It is situated approximately 6 km north-east of Warendorf and 30 km east of Münster.

History
On July 1, 1969 the municipalities Dackmar, Füchtorf and Gröblingen were incorporated.

Notable people

 Hermann von dem Busche (1468–1534), Humanist
 Levin Schücking (1814–1883), German writer, close confidant and editor of Annette von Droste-Hülshoff; married to Louise von Gall (novelist)
 Louise von Gall (1815–1855), novelist
 Joseph Uphues (1850–1911), sculptor
 Luigi Colani (1928–2019), designer
 Monica Theodorescu (born 1963), dressage rider

References